Abdallah ibn Khalid ibn Asid was a member of the Umayyad dynasty and governor of Kufa in 673–675 during the reign of Caliph Mu'awiya I.

Life
Abdallah's father, Khalid ibn Asid, embraced Islam during the conquest of Mecca in 629 and was killed fighting rebel Arab tribes at the Battle of Yamama in 633, during the Ridda wars. Abdallah was appointed the lieutenant governor of Fars or its Ardashir-Khwarrah district by Ziyad ibn Abih, Caliph Mu'awiya's practical viceroy of Iraq and the eastern Caliphate. He gained Ziyad's confidence and before Ziyad's death in 673, Abdallah was appointed his lieutenant governor in Kufa. He led the funeral prayers for Ziyad and continued as Mu'awiya's governor of Kufa until 675. One of Abdallah's sons, Umayya, was married to Ziyad's daughter Ramla.

Abdallah married two daughters of Caliph Uthman, Umm Khalid and Umm Sa'id, though not concurrently. He married off one of his daughters to a grandson of Uthman, Abdallah ibn Amr, who became the parents of four sons and two daughters, one of whom, Umm Abdallah, married Caliph al-Walid I and bore him his son Abd al-Rahman. Another of his daughters, Umm al-Julas, was married to al-Hajjaj ibn Yusuf, the practical viceroy of Iraq and the eastern Caliphate for caliphs Abd al-Malik and al-Walid I. Abdallah's sons Khalid, Abd al-Rahman and Abd al-Aziz served terms as governors of Mecca under later Umayyad caliphs. Khalid also served as governor of Basra and Umayya served as governor of Khurasan.

See also
Attab ibn Asid

References

Bibliography

7th-century Arabs
Umayyad dynasty
Umayyad governors of Kufa
Rashidun governors of Mecca